Lonardi is a surname. Notable people with the surname include:

 Eduardo Lonardi (1896–1956), Argentine military leader who led the junta that overthrew Juan Perón
 Giovanni Lonardi (born 1996), Italian cyclist
 Massimo Lonardi (born 1953), Italian lutenist
 Stefano Lonardi (born 1968), Italian computer scientist and bioinformatician

See also
 Lonardo, surname

Italian-language surnames